The GRA or Grande Raccordo Anulare (literally, "Great Ring Junction") is a toll-free, ring-shaped  long orbital motorway that encircles Rome. 
GRA is one of the most important roads in Rome, and traffic reaches 160,000 vehicles per day as of 2011.

The GRA features 14 tunnels, with lengths varying from the 66 meters of Parco di Veio II tunnel to the 1,150 meters of the Appia Antica tunnel as well as eight rest areas. It has 42 junctions, with the Via Aurelia numbered 1 and the rest following clockwise.

The motorway has always been toll-free. However, there are plans to introduce a fee for vehicles entering the GRA from highways.
Maintenance costs are around 11 million per year.

Its acronym was given after one of its main designers and supporters, Eugenio Gra, chairman of ANAS, the Italian roads Authority, at the time of construction. The official number among the Italian motorways is A90, but is widely known by Romans as Il Raccordo ("The Junction").

History 

Plans for an orbital road around Rome were proposed by the end of World War II.

Construction works started in 1948. The first section, Flaminia to Tiburtina (north-to-east section) opened in 1952, later extended in stages. The last section to be opened was the west-to-north section (Aurelia to Flaminia), in 1970.

Although the GRA was initially planned and built as a single-carriageway road, it was soon clear that traffic was rapidly growing well beyond the expectations. Upgrade works to motorway standards started in late 1950s with first dual-carriageway, four-lane section (Salaria to Tuscolana) opened 1962. Further works were carried over throughout the 1970s, and by 1979, the remainder sections were upgraded to four-lane and the entire ring classified as toll-free highway.

Upgrade works to 6-lane started in 1983 and were completed in stages throughout the 1990s and 2000s. As of April 2008 97% of the GRA was 6-lane with final sections (new tunnel under Via Cassia) opened 2011.

Timeline 
 1948: Building works began.
 1951: The Appia-Aurelia section is opened.
 1952: The Flaminia-Tiburtina section is opened.
 1955: The Tiburtina-Appia section is opened.
 1960:  The road was part of the marathon course of the 1960 Summer Olympics.
 1962: The lane number is doubled in Salaria-Tuscolana section
 1970: The Aurelia-Flaminia section is opened, the ring is completed.
 1979: GRA is now officially a highway.
 1983: Works to a 6-lane set begin.
 1997: 50% of the GRA track is on a 6-lane (2x3) set
 2000: 75% of the GRA track is on a 6-lane set
 2007: 97% of the GRA track is on a 6-lane set
 2011: End of works to the 6-lane set

Future expansion
It has been suggested that a second ring might be constructed in the future, firstly as an attempt to alleviate congestion on the old one and secondly to offer access to a number of new industrial, commercial and residential zones built around it.

In popular culture 
The road was the subject of the 2013 documentary film Sacro GRA which won the Golden Lion at the 70th Venice International Film Festival.

Trivia 
Although the name GRA officially stands for Grande Raccordo Anulare ("Large Orbital Motorway"), the name was actually coined in order to make its acronym be the name of the head of the project, engineer Eugenio Gra.

See also
List of ring roads
Spaghetti junction § Italy – The interchange with SS1 (the Via Aurelia) is a hybrid combination interchange

References

Bibliography
 Marco Pietrolucci. La città del Grande Raccordo Anulare. Gangemi Editore, 2012. 

Ring roads in Italy
Transport in Rome
Autostrade in Italy
Rome Q. XXXI Giuliano-Dalmata
Rome Q. XXX San Basilio
Rome S. IX Aurelio
Rome S. X Trionfale
Rome S. VIII Gianicolense
Metropolitan City of Rome Capital
Venues of the 1960 Summer Olympics
Olympic athletics venues